George Whitelaw (1 January 1937 – 2004) was a Scottish professional footballer who played as a forward for Sunderland.

References

1937 births
2004 deaths
People from Paisley, Renfrewshire
Scottish footballers
Association football forwards
Petershill F.C. players
St Johnstone F.C. players
Sunderland A.F.C. players
Queens Park Rangers F.C. players
Halifax Town A.F.C. players
Carlisle United F.C. players
Stockport County F.C. players
Barrow A.F.C. players
Stenhousemuir F.C. players
English Football League players